Justice Shafi ur Rahman (born 16 February 1929) was one of the longest serving judges of Supreme Court of Pakistan. He was conferred the Nishan-i-Imtiaz for his meritorious services in the field of Human Rights. He is known for writing the Shafi–ur–Rehman Commission Report which is a highly classified document that is still kept hidden from the public eye. It detailed the events leading to the rise to power and death of Muhammad Zia-ul-Haq, the 6th President of Pakistan.

Education
Rahman completed his Master of Arts in Political Science in 1950 and his Bachelor of Laws in 1951.

Public service

Civil Services of Pakistan 1951–1959
Civil Services – Batch of 1951
 Assistant Commissioner Lahore
 Assistant Commissioner Rajanpur
 Deputy Commissioner Bhawalpur

Judicial Services of Pakistan 1959–1994
 Special Civil Judge Lahore
 Senior Civil Judge Lahore
 Additional Sessions Judge Lahore 
 Registrar High Court West Pakistan 
 District and Sessions Judge Abbottabad 
 Divisional Judge Peshawar

Lahore High Court

 Rahman served as a Judge in the Lahore High Court, which has jurisdiction over Punjab. His term started from 1969 to 1979, and from then on he was appointed to the Supreme Court of Pakistan

Supreme Court of Pakistan
Shafi ul Rahman was appointed as an Ad Hoc Judge of the apex court in 1979. He elevated to the Supreme Court of Pakistan as a Senior Justice on 31 July 1981 by Muhammad Zia-ul-Haq, the 6th President of Pakistan.

 Adhoc Judge 14 June 1979 to 29 July 1981 
 Judge 31 July 1981 to 15 February 1994

Other positions
 Chairman, Commission on Eradication of Corruption
 Chairman, Central Zakat Council Pakistan
 Acting Wafaqi Mohtasib   (Federal Ombudsman) of Pakistan in 1983, 1984 and 1987
 Member Syndicate, Quaid-i-Azam University, Islamabad, Pakistan.
 Ahmed Kasuri Murder Inquiry Tribunal 1974  
 President Gen. Zia ul Haq Plane Crash Inquiry Commission 1988  Shafi–ur–Rehman Commission

Personal Website
shafi-ur-rahman.org

Citations
 The Application of Islamic Criminal Law in Pakistan: Sharia in Practice by Tahir Wasti
 The Witch Doctor by A. B. S. Jafri
 'Honour': Crimes, Paradigms and Violence Against Women by Sara Hossain, Lynn Welchman

See also
Supreme Court of Pakistan
List of Pakistanis

References

External links
 Brief biography on Wafaqi Mohtasib (Ombudsman)'s Website

Pakistani judges
Living people
1929 births
Muhajir people
Recipients of Nishan-e-Imtiaz
Judges of the Lahore High Court
Justices of the Supreme Court of Pakistan
University of Allahabad alumni